The 2013 Copa Colsanitas was a women's tennis tournament played on outdoor clay courts. It was the 16th edition of the Copa Colsanitas, and part of the International category of the 2013 WTA Tour. It took place at the Centro de Alto Rendimiento in Bogotá, Colombia, from February 18 through February 24, 2013.

Singles main draw entrants

Seeds 

 Rankings are as of February 11, 2013.

Other entrants 
The following players received wildcards into the singles main draw:
  Catalina Castaño 
  Mariana Duque Mariño
  Yuliana Lizarazo

The following players received entry from the qualifying draw:
  Sharon Fichman
  Beatriz García Vidagany
  Tereza Mrdeža
  Teliana Pereira

Withdrawals
Before the tournament
 Irina-Camelia Begu
 Petra Cetkovská
 Alexandra Dulgheru
 Edina Gallovits-Hall
 Polona Hercog
 Romina Oprandi
 Vera Zvonareva (shoulder injury)

Doubles main draw entrants

Seeds 

 Rankings are as of February 11, 2013.

Other entrants 
The following pairs received wildcards into the doubles main draw:
  Jelena Janković /  Aleksandra Krunić
  María Paulina Pérez /  Paula Andrea Pérez

Champions

Singles 

 Jelena Janković def.  Paula Ormaechea, 6–1, 6–2

Doubles 

  Tímea Babos /  Mandy Minella def.  Eva Birnerová /  Alexandra Panova, 6–4, 6–3

References

External links 
 

Copa Sony Ericsson Colsanitas
Copa Colsanitas
Copa Sony Ericsson Colsanitas